Paraclemensia oligospina is a moth of the family Incurvariidae. It is found in Japan (Honshu and Kyushu islands).

The wingspan is 10–11.5 mm for males and 9.5 mm for females. The forewings are dark brown with a dark green lustre. Adults have been observed flying around the flowers of Quercus serrata and are thought to feed on the flower nectar.

The larvae feed on Castanea crenata. They create an irregular rectangular case.

References

Moths described in 1982
Incurvariidae
Moths of Japan